Leptactina is a genus of flowering plants in the family Rubiaceae. There are about 19 species. They are all native to Africa, where most occur in rainforest habitat.

Species include:
Leptactina adolfi-friedericii
Leptactina angolensis
Leptactina benguelensis
Leptactina deblockiae
Leptactina delagoensis
 Leptactina densiflora Hook.f.
Leptactina epinyctios
Leptactina euclinioides
Leptactina formosa
Leptactina gloeocalyx
Leptactina involucrata
Leptactina latifolia
Leptactina laurentiana
Leptactina leopoldi-secundi
Leptactina liebrechtsiana
Leptactina mannii
Leptactina oxyloba
 Leptactina papyrophloea Verdc.
Leptactina platyphylla
Leptactina polyneura
Leptactina pretrophylax
Leptactina prostrata
Leptactina pynaertii
Leptactina rheophytica
 Leptactina senegambica Hook.f.

References

 
Rubiaceae genera
Taxonomy articles created by Polbot